Art Students League may refer to:

 Art Students League of New York, an art school in Manhattan, New York, US
 Art Students' League of Philadelphia, a short-lived art school started by Thomas Eakins